Charassognathus (meaning 'notched jaw') is an extinct genus of Late Permian cynodonts. Described in 2007 from a locality near Fraserburg, South Africa, Charassognathus is one of the earliest and most basal cynodonts. It is known only from the holotype, which dates from the Late Permian Period. The type and only species is C. gracilis.  The holotype (SAM-PK-K 10369), found in the Tropidostoma Assemblage Zone of the Teekloof Formation, is made up of a crushed skull, partial lower jaw and one leg. 

Charassognathus was a quadrupedal predator. It was named for a notch on its coronoid process which most likely was the insertion point for a chewing muscle, the adductor mandibulae externus. Charassognathus was a small animal, with a skull only  in length.

Description 
Charassognathus has a snout that makes up slightly less than half of the total length of its skull and a long facial process on its septomaxilla.  Other than these two features its skull is that of a typical cynodont. The odd shape of its septomaxilla is more typical of therocephalians than other cynodonts indicating that it may be close to a common ancestor between the two groups.

See also 
 List of therapsids

References 

 

Prehistoric cynodont genera
Lopingian life
Lopingian synapsids of Africa
Permian South Africa
Fossils of South Africa
Fossil taxa described in 2007